MLB Slugfest 2004 is a baseball video game published by Midway Games in 2003. It is the second game in the MLB Slugfest series. Jim Edmonds from the St. Louis Cardinals is the cover athlete.

Reception

The game received "generally favorable reviews" on all platforms except the Game Boy Advance version, which received "unfavorable" reviews, according to the review aggregation website Metacritic.

References

External links
 
 

2003 video games
Baseball video games
Game Boy Advance games
GameCube games
Major League Baseball video games
Midway video games
North America-exclusive video games
PlayStation 2 games
Video games developed in the United States
Video games set in 2004
Xbox games